A statue of Patrick Edward Connor is installed in Salt Lake City's Fort Douglas, in the U.S. state of Utah.

External links

 

Monuments and memorials in Utah
Outdoor sculptures in Salt Lake City
Sculptures of men in Utah
Statues in Utah